Rank comparison chart of officers for armies/land forces of Arabophone states.

Officers

References

Military comparisons